Legislative elections will be held in Greece by July 2023. All 300 seats in the Hellenic Parliament will be contested.

They will be the first elections since 1990 in which the electoral system will not use a bonus seats system, after the 2016 repeal of semi-proportional representation.

Electoral system

The electoral law in effect for the 2023 legislative election is to be the one voted in 2016 by the second last legislature, where SYRIZA held a plurality. This is due to a constitutional provision on amendments to the electoral law: a two-thirds majority (200 or more votes of the Vouli) is necessary for the law to take immediate effect, and for want of such a supermajority – an electoral law comes into effect only in the second-next election. 

SYRIZA's 2016 law is a switch back to simple proportional representation. It ditched the 50-seat majority bonus, such bonus having been in place in various forms since 1990. 

In January 2020, soon after returning to power, New Democracy, which has always been a proponent of majority bonuses since 1974, passed a new electoral law to reinstate the bonus, albeit under a very different formula. The party list coming first would receive 20 extra seats (down from 50, with the remaining seats up from 250 to 280), with a new sliding scale disproportionally helping larger party lists: those receiving between 25% and 40% of the vote would receive one seat for every half percentage point in this range (up to 30 seats), before the proper proportional distribution begins. A winning party could receive up to 50 extra seats. This 2020 law also lacked the supermajority to take immediate effect, and as a result, will take effect only in the next election after 2023.

Compulsory voting will be in force for the elections, with voter registration being automatic. However, none of the legally existing penalties or sanctions have ever been enforced.

Contesting parties
On 8 February 2023 Parliament voted to ban the far-right National Party – Greeks party from running in the elections. New Democracy (Greece) and PASOK voted for the ban, while the Communist Party of Greece, Greek Solution and MeRA25 voted against.

Opinion polls

References

Works cited

Greece
Parliamentary elections in Greece
Legislative